Bill Heck is an American actor who has appeared on Broadway and in television shows, such as The Leftovers and The Old Man, and films, including in the role of Billy Knapp in the Coen Brothers' western The Ballad of Buster Scruggs.

Early life and education
Heck was born in Phoenix, Arizona, but moved to Libertyville, Illinois, a suburb of Chicago, as a child. He graduated from the University of Evansville in Indiana and went to N.Y.U. to gain a graduate degree in acting.

Career
Heck took his first Broadway leading role in the Cabaret revival in 2014. Off-Broadway, Heck starred in Horton Foote's epic The Orphans' Home Cycle, Angels in America with Buster Scruggs co-star Zoe Kazan, as well as Water by the Spoonful.

On television, Heck had a guest role in The Alienist and appeared in The Leftovers.

At L.A. Outfest in 2013, Heck won the Grand Jury Award for Best Actor for his role in Pit Stop.

Heck appeared as Billy Knapp in the vignette "The Gal Who Got Rattled", one of six separate stories of the American Wild West in the Coen Brothers-directed The Ballad of Buster Scruggs. To prepare for the role, Heck read The Oregon Trail: A New American Journey by Rinker Buck.

Personal life
Heck married Broadway co-star Maggie Lacey in 2011.

Filmography

Film

Television

References

External links
 

21st-century American male actors
Living people
American people of German descent
Year of birth missing (living people)
People from Libertyville, Illinois
University of Evansville alumni
People from Phoenix, Arizona
American male stage actors
American male television actors
New York University alumni
Theatre World Award winners